Progress of Theoretical and Experimental Physics is a monthly peer-reviewed scientific journal published by Oxford University Press on behalf of the Physical Society of Japan. It was established as Progress of Theoretical Physics in July 1946 by Hideki Yukawa and obtained its current name in January 2013.

The journal is part of the SCOAP3 initiative.

References

External links 
 

Physics journals
English-language journals
Publications established in 1946
Theoretical physics
Monthly journals
Oxford University Press academic journals
Open access journals
Particle physics journals